Bohemian Paradise is a Protected Landscape Area and a region in Bohemia in the Czech Republic. It was declared in 1955, as the first nature reserve in the country. At first, it was 95 square kilometres in area; today it is almost 182 km². This area is in the north of Bohemia and north-eastward from the capital city Prague. Borders of the region are not clearly defined, but there are some towns which could demarcate rough borders, like Turnov, Jičín, and Mnichovo Hradiště.

Natural environment
One of the most recognizable elements of Bohemian Paradise is the sandstone rock which many of the surrounding towns are constructed of. There are many rocks which have been shaped by wind, water, frost, erosion, and humans into unique shapes. These include, for instance, the Hrubé, Suché, and Klokočské Rocks. 

The Prachov Rocks area of rock formations is particularly noteworthy. Since 1933, the area with 60 million year old formations has been a protected natural reserve. Some scenes for major television and film productions were filmed here.

The Hrubá Skála rock town area (Hruboskalské skalní město), with volcanic sandstone pillars, is also significant. A chateau, also called Hrubá Skála, is located high up on a rock platform. The original mansion was built in the 14th century but was extensively damaged over the years and re-built several times, finally in the style of a Renaissance chateau. The property is now operated as a hotel and spa.

Kozákov is the highest hill in the area. There are a tourist chalet and a lookout tower. Kozákov was originally a volcano. Thus, it is a place where precious stones are found. The treatment of these gems has been connected with the history of the city of Turnov called “The heart of the Bohemian Paradise” for several centuries.

Trosky Castle, consisting of two 14th-century ruins, is located high on the summits of two basalt volcanic plugs, 15 km from Turnov; the caves nearby can also be visited.

Other places of interest in Bohemian Paradise are the Bozkov dolomite caves, which contain the largest underground lake in the Czech Republic. The Podtrosecké Valley is situated below the ruins of Trosky Castle, one of the symbols of Bohemian Paradise. The valley is known for its countryside and several ponds, e.g., Věžák, Nebák, Vidlák. Plakánek valley begins near the Kost Castle and ends in the settlement Rašovec. There is a cycle route in this area. There are also a variety of ruins in the region, including Frýdštějn Castle and Valdštejn Castle.

Cultural sights
Two well-known castles in the area are Trosky and Kost. Other castles in the area include Sychrov, Hrubý Rohozec, Hrubá Skála, and Humprecht. There are also many castle ruins, such as Frýdštejn and Valdštejn, and some buildings built in folk architecture style, for instance, Dlaskův and Boučkův Estates.

Gallery

References

External links

Protected Landscape Area Bohemian Paradise (in Czech)
Photos of Landmarks in Bohemian Paradise and Travel Information
Nature in Bohemian Paradise (in Czech)
Borders of the Protected Landscape Area
Information about Places in Bohemian Paradise
Bozkov Caves (in Czech) 
Bohemian Paradise Association
Museum of Bohemian Paradise in Turnov
Official website of Turnov

Protected landscape areas in the Czech Republic
Global Geoparks Network members
Protected areas established in 1955
Geography of the Hradec Králové Region
Tourist attractions in the Hradec Králové Region
Geography of the Liberec Region
Geography of the Central Bohemian Region
Tourist attractions in the Liberec Region
Tourist attractions in the Central Bohemian Region
Geoparks in the Czech Republic
1955 establishments in Czechoslovakia
Jablonec nad Nisou District
Jičín District
Liberec District
Mladá Boleslav District
Semily District